Luís Miguel Serra Cruz Elói (born 10 March 1996)  is a Portuguese footballer who plays for Sintrense on loan from Sporting B, as a forward.

Football career
On 24 May 2015, Elói made his professional debut with Sporting B in a 2014–15 Segunda Liga match against Sporting Braga B.

References

External links

Stats and profile at LPFP 

1996 births
Footballers from Lisbon
Living people
Portuguese footballers
Association football forwards
Sporting CP B players
Liga Portugal 2 players
S.U. Sintrense players